Sol C. Siegel (March 30, 1903 – December 29, 1982) was an American film producer. Two of the numerous films he produced, A Letter to Three Wives (1949) and Three Coins in the Fountain (1954), were nominated for the Academy Award for Best Picture.

Early life and career
Sol C. Siegel was born on March 30, 1903, in New York City. In the early 1930s, Siegel was sales manager of the Brunswick-Columbia record label.
In 1934, he began his Hollywood career by assisting his brother, Moe Siegel, with the merger of six small production studios into Republic Pictures. He stayed on at Republic as an executive producer, working with Gene Autry and John Wayne.

Sol C.Siegel was born March 30 or 31st (local records lost during WWII) in Kalvarija, Poland, now Lithuania.

During a contract dispute between Republic Studios and Gene Autry Mr. Siegel brought in a member of a singing group called "The Sons of the Pioneers", whose name was Leonard Slye, and changed his screen name to Roy Rogers.

Producer
In October 1940, Siegel left his position as head of Republic Studios to be a producer at Paramount Pictures.

In 1946, he moved to 20th Century Fox.
Two of the films he produced there, A Letter to Three Wives (1949) and Three Coins in the Fountain (1954), were nominated for the Academy Award for Best Picture.  He also produced The Iron Curtain (1948) and later the Marilyn Monroe musical Gentlemen Prefer Blondes, as well as the star-studded High Society for Metro-Goldwyn-Mayer starring Frank Sinatra, Grace Kelly, Bing Crosby, and Louis Armstrong.

MGM
In 1956, Siegel joined Metro-Goldwyn-Mayer. Towards the end of the year, Dore Schary was fired as head of production and Siegel was rumoured to be given his job. However Ben Thau got the job and Siegel remained a producer, making Les Girls, Man on Fire, Merry Andrew, and Some Came Running.

Siegel was appointed head of studio operations at MGM for three years in April 1958. The following month he was appointed vice president in charge of production. By this stage, the studio had already greenlit a number of movies that would go on to be major successes, including Ben-Hur and North by Northwest.

During Siegel's time, MGM produced the major Cinerama epic How the West Was Won. He was also the subject of an extortion attempt.

The success of Ben-Hur encouraged Siegel to authorise a series of remakes at MGM such as Cimarron, Four Horsemen of the Apocalypse, and Mutiny on the Bounty. All these films lost money for the studio. This — along with a number of other box office failures — led to him being replaced as head of production in January 1962 by Robert M. Weitman.

Siegel then began working as an independent producer. He ran his own production company from 1964 to 1967.

Siegel died of a heart attack in Los Angeles on December 29, 1982, aged 79.

Personal life
He was married to Ruth (Shor) Siegel until her death in 1962; together they had three sons, Andrew, Norman, and Richard.

Selected filmography

Unmade films

References

External links
 

1903 births
1982 deaths
20th Century Studios people
American film producers
Film serial crew
American film studio executives
Metro-Goldwyn-Mayer executives
20th-century American businesspeople